Put Ya Boots On, is the debut album by Double X Posse. it was released on August 11, 1992, under Big Beat Records.

Track listing
 Put Ya Boots On 
 The Headcracker
 The Pure Thing
 Somethin' Funky Ta Step To
 Get Ya Props Up
 Executive Class
 Girls Be Frontin'...
 Not Gonna Be Able To Do It
 Addicted To The Game 
 Ruffneck
 Executive Class II
 We Got It Goin' On
 School Of Hard Knocks
 Get Mines or Get Naked
 We Got It Goin' On (Remix) (Bonus track)

References

1992 albums
Double X Posse albums
Big Beat Records (American record label) albums